Holzinger-class patrol vessels are offshore patrol vessels in service with the Mexican Navy. They are a Mexican design, based on the  developed by the Spanish Naval Company Empresa Nacional Bazán in 1982. Holzinger-class patrol vessels have a smaller helicopter deck than the Uribe class and have main armaments (two twin US MK1 Bofors 40 mm AA mounts) at 'A' position. They are able to operate MBB Bo 105 helicopters on board. 

Uribe-class ships were the first medium size vessels built by the Mexican Navy. Two first hulls were built at Tampico Naval Shipyard (Tamaulipas); the second two hulls were built at Salina Cruz Naval Shipyard (Oaxaca).

Ships 
 ARM Holzinger (PO 131) (1991)
 ARM Godínez (PO 132) (1991)
 ARM De la Vega (PO 133) (1994)
 ARM Berriozabal (PO 134) (1994)

References 
 Faulkner, K. (1999) Jane's Warship Recognition Guide. 2nd Edition. London: Harper Collins Publishers.
 Friedman, N. (1997) The Naval Institute Guide to World Naval Weapons Systems, 1997–1998. US Naval Institute Press.  
 Wertheim, E. (2007) Naval Institute Guide to Combat Fleets of the World: Their Ships, Aircraft, and Systems. 15 edition. US Naval Institute Press.

Patrol ship classes
Patrol vessels of the Mexican Navy
Ships built in Mexico